This article include details of 2007 AFC U-19 Women's Championship qualification.

Group A 
All matches were held at Kuala Lumpur, Malaysia (UTC+8).

Group B 
All matches were held at Taipei, Taiwan (UTC+8).

References 

AFC U-19 Women's Championship qualification
Qual
qualification
AFc
2007 in youth sport